Harold Michael Phillipoff (born February 14, 1956) is a Canadian former professional ice hockey left winger.  He was drafted in the first round, 10th overall, by the Atlanta Flames in the 1976 NHL Amateur Draft.  He played in 141 games in the National Hockey League: 118 with the Flames (from 1977-1979) and 23 with the Chicago Black Hawks (from 1980-1981).

In 1979, he was traded from the Atlanta Flames with Greg Fox, Tom Lysiak, Pat Ribble and Miles Zaharko to the Chicago Blackhawks for Ivan Boldirev, Darcy Rota and Phil Russell.

Phillipoff was also drafted by the Edmonton Oilers of the World Hockey Association; however, he never played in that league.

Personal life
Phillipoff was born in Kamsack, Saskatchewan and raised in Canora, Saskatchewan.

Career statistics

External links

1976 NHL Amateur Draft - Harold Phillipoff

1956 births
Atlanta Flames draft picks
Atlanta Flames players
Canadian ice hockey left wingers
Chicago Blackhawks players
Dallas Black Hawks players
Edmonton Oilers (WHA) draft picks
Fredericton Express players
Ice hockey people from Saskatchewan
Living people
National Hockey League first-round draft picks
New Westminster Bruins players
Nova Scotia Voyageurs players
Oklahoma City Stars players
People from Canora, Saskatchewan
People from Kamsack, Saskatchewan